The 1982 Air Force Falcons football team represented the United States Air Force Academy in the Western Athletic Conference (WAC) during the 1982 NCAA Division I-A football season. Led by fourth-year head coach Ken Hatfield, Air Force played its home games at Falcon Stadium in Colorado Springs and finished the regular season at 7–5 (4–3 in WAC, third), for their first winning record in nine years.

Following their upset of #18 Notre Dame on November 20, Air Force was invited to play in the Hall of Fame Classic in Birmingham on December 31, where they rallied to upset Vanderbilt and finished  It was the first bowl appearance for the Falcons in twelve years and their first postseason win.

Schedule

Personnel

Awards and honors
 Dave Schrek, guard, 3rd team All-American (AP), 1st team All-WAC

References

Air Force
Air Force Falcons football seasons
All-American Bowl champion seasons
Air Force Falcons football